The Abalone League was an amateur baseball and softball club based in Carmel-by-the-Sea, California from 1921 through 1938. It was the first softball league in the Western United States. The League was incorporated on September 8, 1927. The League was a Carmel focal point for many years. Early players included writers Jimmy Hopper and Harry Leon Wilson, actor Frank Sheridan, developer of Pebble Beach S. F. B. Morse, Philip Wilson, Sr., of the Philip Wilson Building, and Fred and Harrison Godwin of the La Playa Hotel.

History

The Abalone League had its beginning on Carmel Point adjacent to Carmel-by-the-Sea, California, after World War I in 1921. Games were held in a rough diamond field next to the Charles King Van Riper house among the pine trees overlooking the sea. Charles and Helen van Riper and his friends, aviator Thorne Taylor and writer Talbert Josselyn (brother of photographer Lewis Josselyn) founded the first softball league in the Western United States, dubbed the Abalone League. The league got its name from the Abalone Cove, which was adjacent to the playing field. They played every evening in the summer months and on Sundays all year round. Six teams made up the league. Josselyn, Lee Gottfried, and Thorn Taylor were some of the first players. Charles Van Riper was the first "commissioner" and was responsible to begin each season. Journalist Robert Welles Ritchie served as the league's first umpire. They played two games on Sunday and had three playing fields, at Carmel Point, Carmel Woods, and the Hatton Fields.

The “Abalone Song,” was penned in Carmel around 1907 by writer George Sterling, and his friends, Jack London, and Sinclair Lewis. They sang the song while pounding Monterey Bay abalone at gala Carmel beach parties.

 
Writer and journalist Frederick R. Bechdolt was an early member of the Abalone League, along Edward Kuster, Charley Van Riper, James Hopper, John Hillaiard, Ernest Schweninger, Talbert Josselyn, R. C. Smith, and Winsor Josselyn.

Talbert Josselyn was known as the "Judge Landis" of the Abalone League. Winsor Josselyn, brother of Lewis and Talbert Josselyn, worte about the league's opening in the January 16, 1931, edition of the Carmel Pine Cone. Winsor said: "The four captains are in daily conference with their teams. The Pine Cone is preparing special sports extras to satisfy the game-mad fans. A poet is inditing an heroic verse, a composer is pounding out an anthem, and artist is creating a master banner to float above the park." The four teams in the League at the time were the Shamrocks, the Tigers, the Giants, and the Rangers. Carmel Mayor Herbert Heron pitched the first ball that ushered in the 1931 Series of twelve games.

In 1925, the San Francisco Chronicle ran an essay entitled "Carmel Sports." The pictures showed members of the league. One picture showed artist Jo Mora at bat. Two Abalone Cup trophies were awarded at the end of each season with the losing team giving a gala banquet at the La Playa Hotel. One trophy was silver called the Hooper Cup, the other was an ornate stove top from the Monterey Herald stove, called the Herald trophy. Each year the winning team player's names were itched on each trophy and they were kept by the team until the next season.

Each team had ten players, two women, and the rest men. Ages were between ten and fifteen on the same team as with forty and fifty-year-olds. The teams were made up of writers, artist, musicians, stars of the stage, and a grocery truck driver. Team names were Shamrocks, Sardines, Whales, Seals, Sanddabs, Goldfish, and the Sharks. Later the teams were uniforms.

On September 8, 1927, the Abalone League became a corporation and was chartered under the laws of the State of California. The founders of the league and first board of directors were aviator and developer Byington Ford, businessman James Cooper Doud, Talbert Josselyn, director Frank Sheridan, and businessman Ernest Schweninger. The articles of incorporation stated that the "Abalone League is a cooperative association organized for the purpose of fostering athletics, particularly baseball, and to provide for the physical benefit of Carmel's citizenry." As a corporation, the league was able to sell certificates of membership to help fund the league's events.

The Abalone League disbanded in 1938 just before World War II.

In 1940, Winsor Josselyn was interviewed by the Carmel Pine Cone and talked about how the Abalone League was a Carmel focal point for many years. Early group players included writers Jimmy Hopper Bob Pinkerton, and Harry Leon Wilson, actor Frank Sheridan, developer of  Pebble Beach  S. F. B. Morse, Kit Cooke, Helen Wilson, Elliot and Marion Boke, Philip Wilson, Sr., (of the Philip Wilson Building), Col. Fletcher Dutton, Fred and Harrison Godwin (of the La Playa Hotel), and Don Hale. Carmel builder A. Carlyle Stoney built his home on Carmel Point, on the third base line of the Abalone League baseball field. He sponsored a team with three of his brothers that played in the league.

Carmel Arts and Crafts Club

In April 1927, the Abalone League bought the deed to the Carmel Arts and Crafts Club and theater on Monte Verde Street and the proceeds were used to pay off the Forest Theater debts. At one point, the Abalone League renamed it the Abalone Theatre, and staged its own plays at the Arts and Crafts Theater, where the Golden Bough Playhouse now stands, to make money for the league. 

Byington Ford and his wife Ruth, were active in the Abalone League productions at the Arts and Crafts Theater. Original dramas by local playwrights as Martin Flavin, Perry Newberry, and Ira Remsen were produced in the Arts and Crafts Theater at that time. The play The Bad Man, a three-act comedy by American playwright Porter Emerson Browne, was put on by the Arts and Crafts Theater on January 15, 1926. Artist Jo Mora, Byington Ford, and other Abalone Players were among the actors in the play.

In 1929, the Abalone theater lost money and was sold it to Edward Kuster. Kuster remodeled the facility and renamed it the Studio Theatre of the Golden Bough. He moved all of his activities, plays concerts, traveling theatre groups, lectures, to the theatre on Monte Verde Street. In 1940, Kuster renamed the theater to the Golden Bough Playhouse and again put on plays, foreign films, and movies.

Legacy

At the Van-Riper House in Carmel-by-the-Sea, there is a historic plaque about the Abalone League. The text of the plaque provides a history of the league. It says:

Notable alumni 
  S. F. B. Morse
 Herbert Heron
 Jimmy Hopper
 Harry Leon Wilson
 Frank Sheridan

See also
 List of organized baseball leagues
 Timeline of Carmel-by-the-Sea, California
 Amateur baseball in the United States

References

External links

Baseball leagues in California
Sports leagues established in 1927
1927 establishments in California
Non-profit organizations based in California
Carmel-by-the-Sea, California